the South Sudan women's national basketball team represents South Sudan in international women's basketball competitions.

History
The FIBA Women's AfroBasket 2021 Zone 5 Qualifiers marked the first time South Sudan was represented in women's basketball at the international level since gaining independence in 2011 and becoming a FIBA member in 2013. the team was placed in Zone 5 Group A, with Egypt, Kenya, Rwanda. South Sudan played its first official international game on 12 July 2021, against the Egyptian team. They lost to Egypt by 30 points (65–95).

In 2023, South Sudan marked history by winning its first international game against Rwanda by a margin of 14 points.

Results
Note: updated through 22 February 2023

Team

Current roster
Roster for the 2023 Women's Afrobasket qualification.

Competitive record

Olympic Games

FIBA Women's World Cup

AfroBasket Women

References

External links

FIBA profile

Basketball W
National
Women's national basketball teams